HCP may refer to:

Businesses 
 HashiCorp (NASDAQ: HCP), an American software company
 Healthpeak Properties (formerly HCP, Inc.), an American investment company
 H. Cegielski – Poznań, a Polish manufacturing company
 Health Consumer Powerhouse, a Swedish think tank
 Highland Capital Partners, a venture capital firm

Health and medicine 
 Healthcare professional
 Hereditary coproporphyria
 Himalayan Cataract Project
 Human Connectome Project
 Hydrocephalus, or "water on the brain"
 Haemolysin-coregulated protein, in the Type VI secretion system 
 Healthcare proxy

Other uses 
 Aga Khan Historic Cities Programme
 Habitat Conservation Plan
Hamiltonian Circuit Problem, in computer science
 Handicap (horse racing), in horse racing
 Hardened cement paste
 Harding Charter Preparatory High School, in Oklahoma City, Oklahoma, United States
 Haut Commissariat au Plan in Morocco
 Heritage College, Perth, in Australia
 Hexagonal close-packed arrangement of spheres
 Hitachi Content Platform, the foundational component of the Hitachi Data Systems cloud architecture
 High card points in contract bridge
 Howrah Police Commissionerate, in West Bengal, India
 Methylidynephosphane, a phosphaalkyne
 Hexagonal Close-Packed crystal structure